Chuanqiandian may be:
One of the Chuanqiangdian Miao languages (Western Hmongic)
First Chuanqiandian Miao (Hmong)